Evansville High School (EHS) is a high school in Evansville, Wisconsin, United States. It was designed by Helmut Ajango. It is located at 640 South 5th Street. The school's teams compete as the Blue Devils. In 2006 it was a No Child Left Behind Blue Ribbon school. Enrollment as of January 2014 was reported at 529. Evansville High School offers eight AP courses as well as "articulated" courses in engineering drawing and design; welding; business law, accounting, and some select classes through Lakeland College (Wisconsin).

The school uses a geothermal system.

References

External links
Evansville High School website

Public high schools in Wisconsin
Schools in Rock County, Wisconsin